Acorralada (Trapped) is an American telenovela produced by Venevisión. Univision aired Acorralada from January 15, 2007 to October 5, 2007 on weekday afternoons at 2pm/1c. It was rebroadcast in late 2011 through April 2012 on Univision's sister network, Telefutura (now UniMás). It was filmed in Miami, Florida (USA), and lasted about 187 episodes. It is the second long-running telenovela that Venevisión Productions has produced without its former co-producer Fonovideo. Acorralada is the theme and another notable song "Eres Tu" written by Angel Arce and Jossel Calveiro. It stars as Alejandra Lazcano, Mariana Torres, Sonya Smith, David Zepeda, William Levy, and Bernie Paz as the main protagonists, while Jorge Luis Pila, Maritza Rodríguez, Frances Ondiviela, Orlando Fundichely, Alicia Plaza, Virna Flores, Grettel Trujillo, Diana Osorio, Valentina Bove, Yul Bürkle, Julián Gil and Juan Vidal are the main villains/ antagonists of the story.

It began airing in Venezuela on December 10, 2008 in the 11 pm time slot on Venevisión and finished on July 25, 2009 with seven months of airing and being the most successful telenovela for its time slot since La fea más bella.

Cisneros Media released Acorralada on DVD in the United States on December 2, 2008, a week before its debut on Venezuelan television. The DVD set consists of three discs, and has a running time of 596 minutes. The show is heavily edited in order to fit into three discs. Neither Venevision nor Univision have plans to offer a more complete version.

The show has been broadcast in more than 50 countries.

Plot summary 
Fedora Garcés Enesma (Sonya Smith) is a woman who had everything, a husband she loved, two small daughters and a perfume factory with which she and her family had a comfortable life. An ambitious and ruthless woman named Octavia Alarcón de Irazábal (Frances Ondiviela), out of sheer envy, snatched away everything she had.

Octavia's husband murdered Fedora's husband and got Fedora to appear as the culprit of that murder. Octavia snatched her perfume factory, her fortune and her daughters leaving Fedora locked in prison for that murder she did not commit.

The daughters of Fedora were given to an older woman who raised them by making them believe that they were her granddaughters by naming them Diana and Gabriela. Octavia and her family, the Irazábal, became a rich and powerful family thanks to what Octavia stole from Fedora.

Years later Fedora is released by a pardon and begins to work like singer under the nickname of "La Gaviota", but with the idea to recover what they snatched away from her and get revenge on the Irazábal family.

Meanwhile, Fedora's daughters, Diana (Alejandra Lazcano) and Gaby (Mariana Torres), who have grown up humbly with their adoptive grandmother, come to work at Octavia's house. Gaby as a servant and Diana as Octavia's mother-in-law's nurse. Their paths cross with the two sons of Octavia, Maximiliano         (David Zepeda) and Larry Irazabal Alarcón (William Levy).

Gaby falls in love with Larry and Diana of Maximiliano, two loves that, although they are reciprocated, are impossible by the obstacles that begun by Octavia and are owed to Gaviota.

Cast

Starring 
 Alejandra Lazcano as Diana Soriano 
 David Zepeda as Maximiliano "Max" Irazábal Alarcón. / Alejandro Salvatierra
 Maritza Rodríguez as Débora Mondragón de Dávila. (Killed by the Police). / Marfil Mondragón de Irazábal; villains. (Dies by accidental poisoning)
 Jorge Luis Pila as Diego Suárez; main Villain. (Dies eaten by a shark).
 Mariana Torres as Gabriela "Gaby" Soriano
 Roberto Mateos as Francisco "Paco" Vázquez
 Sonya Smith as Fedora Garcés Enesma "La Gaviota".
 Bernie Paz as Rodrigo Santana.

Also starring 
 Frances Ondiviela as Octavia Alarcón viuda de Irázabal; main Villain. (Dies stabbed in the back and struck by a train)
 Ofelia Cano as Yolanda Alarcón
 Alicia Plaza as Bruna Pérez; villain. (Killed by Octavia and Marfil at the hospital)
 Griselda Noguera as Lala Suárez
 Virna Flores as Camila Linares; villain. (Ends in prison)
 Maritza Bustamante as Caramelo Vázquez
 Raúl Olivo as Emilio Linares.
 Elizabeth Gutiérrez as Paola Irazábal Alarcón. (Dies in a car accident while running away from Octavia)
 Grettel Trujillo as Isabel Dávila; villain. (Ends in jail)
 William Levy as Larry Irazábal Alarcón
 Mariana Huerdo as Silvita Delgado; comic Villain. (Later good)
 Andrés Mistage as Jorge.
 Diana Osorio as Pilar Álamo; villain. (Becomes good and leaves the country)
 Valentina Bove as Sharon Santana; villain. (She ends crazy in the asylum)
 Orlando Fundichely as Dr. Ignacio Montiel; villain. (Ends in prison)
 Paulo Quevedo as René Romero
 Yul Bürkle as Andrés Dávila; villain. (Killed by an unaccidental shoot by Gaby)
 Julián Gil as Francisco "Pancholón" Suárez; villain (leaves the country and goes to Puerto Rico)
 Juan Vidal as Enrique "Kike" Díaz; villain. (Killed by the Police)

Recurring 
 Liannet Borrego as Nancy
 Nelida Ponce as Miguelina Soriano
 Sandra García as Samantha; villain. (Killed by Diego and Ignacio in the madhouse fire)
 Miguel Gutiérrez as Licenciado Reynoso. (Killed by Octavia)
 Lucero Lazo as Doña Santa viuda de Irazábal
 Julio Capote as Lorenzo.

Special guest stars 
 Héctor Soberón as Horacio Irázabal; villain. (Killed poisoned by Octavia)
 Thauro as Pablo
 Claudia Reyes as Fiona Valente; villain. (Killed by Diego and Marfil burned alive with the use of a digger)
 Corina Azopardo as Judge Villagrande
 Sebastián Ligarde as Licenciado Borges
 Khotan Fernández as Gerardo
 Andrés García Jr. as Álvaro Ferrer

References

External links
 .
 Acorralada Forum.

2007 telenovelas
2007 American television series debuts
2007 American television series endings
2007 Venezuelan television series debuts
2007 Venezuelan television series endings
Spanish-language American telenovelas
Television shows set in Miami
Venevisión telenovelas
Univision telenovelas
Venezuelan telenovelas
American telenovelas
Television shows filmed in Miami